Pedro Manuel (died 1 January 1550) was a Roman Catholic prelate who served as Archbishop of Santiago de Compostela (1546–1550), Bishop of Zamora (1534–1546), and Bishop of León (1523–1534).

Biography
On 12 June 1523, Pedro Manuel was appointed during the papacy of Pope Adrian VI as Bishop of León. On 17 June 1534, he was appointed during the papacy of Pope Clement VII as bishop of Zamora. On 9 April 1546, Pedro Manuel was appointed during the papacy of Pope Paul III as Archbishop of Santiago de Compostela. He served as Archbishop of Santiago de Compostela until his death on 1 January 1550. While bishop, he was the principal consecrator of Juan González Munébraga, Bishop of Tarazona (1547).

References

External links and additional sources
 (for Chronology of Bishops) 
 (for Chronology of Bishops) 
 (for Chronology of Bishops) 
 (for Chronology of Bishops) 
 (for Chronology of Bishops) 
 (for Chronology of Bishops) 

16th-century Roman Catholic archbishops in Spain
1550 deaths
Bishops appointed by Pope Adrian VI
Bishops appointed by Pope Clement VII
Bishops appointed by Pope Paul III